The 2019–20 Saint Mary's Gaels men's basketball team represented Saint Mary's College of California during the 2019–20 NCAA Division I men's basketball season. The team was led by head coach Randy Bennett in his 19th season at Saint Mary's. The Gaels played their home games at the University Credit Union Pavilion in Moraga, California as members of the West Coast Conference. They finished the season 26–8, 11–5 in WCC play to finish in a tie for third place. They defeated Pepperdine and BYU to advance to the championship game of the WCC tournament where they lost to Gonzaga. Despite being a virtual lock to receive an at-large bid to NCAA tournament, all postseason play was cancelled amid the COVID-19 pandemic.

Previous season
The Gaels finished the 2018–19 season 22–12, 11–5 in West Coast Conference play to finish in second place. As the No. 2 seed in the WCC tournament, they defeated Pepperdine in the semifinals and upset No. 1 seed Gonzaga to become champions of the WCC Tournament. As a result, they received an automatic bid to the NCAA tournament as a No. 11 where they lost to Villanova in the first round.

Offseason

Departures

Incoming transfers

2019 recruiting class

2020 recruiting class

Roster

Schedule and results

|-
!colspan=9 style=| Non-conference regular season

|-
!colspan=9 style=| WCC regular season

|-
!colspan=9 style=| WCC tournament

Source

Rankings

*AP does not release post-NCAA Tournament rankings

References

Saint Mary's
Saint Mary's Gaels men's basketball seasons
Saint Mary's
Saint Mary's